The A. M. Qattan Foundation is a not-for-profit developmental organisation based in Ramallah.

It was founded in 1993 by the Palestinian businessman and politician Abdel Mohsin Al-Qattan. The chairman is his son Omar Al-Qattan.

In June 2018, the Foundation opened a $21 million headquarters building and arts centre in Ramallah.

References

External links

Museums in the West Bank
Museums established in 2018
Organizations based in Ramallah